Roque Cordero (August 16, 1917 – December 27, 2008) was a Panamanian composer.

Life

Born in Panama City, he studied composition under Ernst Krenek and conducting under Dimitri Mitropoulos, Stanley Chapple, and Léon Barzin before becoming director of the Institute of Music and Artistic Director and conductor of the National Symphony of his native country. Later he was assistant director of the Latin American Music Center (LAMúsiCa), professor of composition at Indiana University, and, from 1972, distinguished professor emeritus at Illinois State University.

His works have been widely performed in Latin America, the United States and Europe, receiving international awards for his First Symphony (Honorable Mention, Detroit, 1947), Rapsodia Campesina (First Prize, Panama, 1953), Second Symphony (Caro de Boesi Award, Caracas, Venezuela, 1957), Violin Concerto (1974 Koussevitzky International Recording Award), and Third String Quartet (Chamber Music Award, San José, Costa Rica, 1977). Several of his compositions have been recorded by the Detroit Symphony Orchestra, the Louisville Orchestra, the Chicago Sinfonietta (Eight Miniatures for Small Orchestra, Paul Freeman, conductor, Cedille Records) and various chamber music groups and soloists. He has appeared as guest conductor in Argentina, Brazil, Chile, Colombia, El Salvador, Guatemala, Panama, and in the United States.  His "Sonata breve" for solo piano, composed in 1966, is published by C.F. Peters. His Second Symphony was performed by the Seattle Philharmonic in April 2008.

In 2020, his complete works for solo piano were published by Albany Records. They were recorded by Dr. Tuyen Tonnu, Associate Professor of Piano, at Illinois State University.

After retiring he spent the last eight years of his life living with his family in Dayton, Ohio, where he died at age 91.

Selected works

Orchestral
Adagio Tragico, String Orchestra
Capricho Interiorano: Panamanian Folk Ballet Suite
Cinco Mensaje
Concerto for Violin
Symphony No. 2 in One Movement

Chamber music
Dodecaconcerto
Dos Piezas Cortas
Mensaje Funebre
Paz, Paix, Peace, Harp and Ensemble
Permutaciones 7
Quinteto
Soliloquios No. 1
Soliloquios No. 2
Soliloquios No. 3
Sonata
Sonatina
String Quartet No. 1
String Quartet No. 2
Tres Mensajes Breves, Viola and Piano
Variations and Theme for Five, Woodwind Quintet

Piano
Cinco Miniaturas para Piano
Duo 1954, Two Pianos
Five New Preludes for Piano
Miniatura para Piano
Neuve Preludios
Nostalgia
Preludio para la Cuna Vacía
Tres Meditaciones Poéticas
Tres Piececillas para Alina
Sonata Breve
Sonata for Piano
Sonatina Ritmica
Variaciones para la Segunda Miniatura

Choral
Cantata para la Paz
Dos Pequenas Piezas Corales

Vocal
Musica Veinte, Vocal Soloists and Ensemble

References

External links
Peermusic Classical: Roque Cordero Composer's Publisher and Bio
LAMúsica - Latin American Music Center at the Indiana University Jacobs School of Music
Roque Cordero's Memorial Page from the Latin American Music Center at the Indiana University Jacobs School of Music
Roque Cordero: The biggest secret of modern music when it come to panamanian avantgarde music composer
Interview with Roque Cordero, August 30, 1989

1917 births
2008 deaths
Panamanian composers
Panamanian male musicians
Male composers
Indiana University faculty
Illinois State University faculty
People from Panama City
20th-century male musicians